Leamington District Secondary School (LDSS) is a public high school in Leamington, Ontario. Home of the Lions, it has an enrollment of approximately 1000 students. In 2018 LDSS became an IB World School authorized to offer the Diploma Programme. LDSS feeder schools are located throughout Leamington and neighbouring town Wheatley, Ontario. This includes: Queen Elizabeth Public School, Gore Hill Public School, Margaret D. Bennie Public School, Mt. Carmel-Blytheswood Public School and East Mersea Public School.

Facility 
Located at 80 Oak Street West, Leamington Ontario, Canada, Leamington District Secondary School is minutes away from the downtown core, and the Leamington Kinsmen Recreation Complex (formerly the Sherk Centre).

The construction of the new Leamington District Secondary School was started on May 25, 2016, with a completion date of September 2017. The old LDSS was closed upon completion of the new school which opened on September 5, 2017.

The new school replaced the former high school which was built in 1953. The school expanded with additions in 1958 and 1961.

The original High School was built in 1923.

Athletics 

LDSS competes in the Windsor & Essex County Secondary School Athletic Association (WECSSA) athletic division and offers a variety of sports opportunities including boys and girls volleyball, basketball, hockey, and soccer, boys baseball, and girls softball, as well as cross country, tennis, badminton, golf, and swimming. The school mascot is a lion named Snoil, who is often seen at school events. The school's most prominent rival is Leamington's second high school Cardinal Carter Catholic High School.

Notable alumni 
 Darren McCarty
 David Suzuki
 Nino Ricci

References

School Home

See also
List of high schools in Ontario

Educational institutions in Canada with year of establishment missing
Leamington, Ontario
High schools in Essex County, Ontario
1953 establishments in Ontario
Educational institutions established in 1953